The Vysshaya Liga (Higher League) is the second level ice hockey league in Belarus. It primarily serves as a development league for the Belarusian Extraleague, with most of its clubs serving as affiliates for the higher league.

Champions

External links
Belarus Ice Hockey Federation 

3
Bel